The Dene Thá (/'tɛnɛ ðɑː/) First Nation is a First Nations government of the South Slavey in Northern Alberta, Canada. The people call themselves Dene Dháa (sometimes spelled Dene Tha' or Dene Th'a) or 'Ordinary People' in the Dene Dháh language. Its population is centered primarily in three communities: Bushe River, Meander River, and Chateh (formerly known as Assumption), but approximately 600 members who live off-reserve. Dene Thá First Nation is Treaty 8 nation and a member of the North Peace Tribal Council.

Territories

Until the 1950s, the Dene Thá lived a semi-nomadic lifestyle and hunted in their traditional territory, which included land in the northwestern corner of Alberta, the southern Northwest Territories, and the northeastern corner of British Columbia. Today, many live in permanent settlements in and around Bushe River, Meander River, and Chateh.

The Dene Thá First Nation signed Treaty 8 in 1900.

Demographics
 the First Nations registered population was 2871 with 2017 members living on reserves or crown land and 854 members living off reserve.

Language 
Dene Dháh (/'dɛnɛ ðɑh/) translates to 'Dene language' is the preferred name for the language spoken by the Dene Thá, but linguists and anthropologists commonly refer to the language simply as a dialect of South Slavey. It has been called Slavey, South Slavey, Alberta Slavey, and Dene, a  catch-all term which encompasses several Northern Athabaskan language groups.

Dene Dháh, the only variety of South Slavey spoken in Alberta (Dene Zhatié is spoken in the Northwest Territories), belongs to the Northern Athabaskan subgrouping of the Athabaskan language family. It is closely related to languages such as Dane-Zaa, Kaska, Dëne Sųłiné, and Tłı̨chǫ Yatıì.

Dialects 
Dene Dháh has three distinct dialects: 
 Xewónst’e (Fort Vermilion-Eleske)
 Xewónht’e (Assumption-Habay)
 Kegúnht’u (Bistcho Lake)
Each dialect name translates to "It's like that" and exhibits variation typical of the dialects.

Linguistic vitality 
Most Dene Dháa adults speak Dene Dháh as their first language, and the language is still being passed on to children. In 2006, a survey conducted among school-aged children in Chateh reported a native-speaker proficiency rate of 65%.

Further reading

References

External links
Dene Tha' official website
Ethnologue

Dene governments
First Nations governments in Alberta